State Highway 131 (SH 131) is a  long north–south state highway in the U.S. State of Colorado. SH 131 travels through the towns of State Bridge, Bond, McCoy, Toponas, Yampa, and Oak Creek.

History 
The route was established in the 1920s, when it connected State Bridge to its current terminus at US 40. The route was then paved from its north end to Yampa by 1946. SH 11 (now moved) was deleted by 1954, giving the section from Wolcott to State Bridge to SH 131. The entire route was paved by 1970. SH 131 was then extended to I-70 in 1972.

Major intersections

References

External links

131
Colorado River
Transportation in Eagle County, Colorado
Transportation in Routt County, Colorado